The Paris Boosters was a Class-D South Central League (1912) and Texas–Oklahoma League (1913) baseball team based in Paris, Texas, USA. George Harper and Dickey Kerr played for the team in 1913. Harper finished second on the team in hits while Kerr finished second on the team in wins.

The Boosters finished fourth in the South Central League in 1912 (out of six teams) and second in the Texas–Oklahoma League in 1913. They posted a .640 winning percentage in the latter season.

References

Defunct minor league baseball teams
Paris, Texas
Professional baseball teams in Texas
Defunct baseball teams in Texas
1912 establishments in Texas
Sports clubs disestablished in 1913
1913 disestablishments in Texas
Baseball teams disestablished in 1913
Texas–Oklahoma League teams